The 1895 European Figure Skating Championships were held on January 26 in Budapest, Hungary. Elite figure skaters competed for the title of European Champion in the category of men's singles. The competitors performed only compulsory figures.

Results

Men

Judges:
 Eduard Engelmann, Jr. 
 Karl Fillunger 
 H. von Haslmayer 
 E. Holletschek 
 J. Ehrlich

References

Sources
 Result List provided by the ISU

European Figure Skating Championships, 1895
European Figure Skating Championships
International figure skating competitions hosted by Hungary
1895 in Hungarian sport
International sports competitions in Budapest
January 1895 sports events